Davide Bettella (born 7 April 2000) is an Italian professional footballer who plays as a centre-back for  club Palermo, on loan from Monza.

Club career

Inter
Bettella is a youth product of Inter Milan, and started playing for their under-19 squad in the 2017–18 season. He also represented the club in the 2007–18 UEFA Youth League, he missed the last penalty kick in the shootout as Inter was eliminated by Manchester City in the Round of 16.

Atalanta
On 29 June 2018, he signed a contract with Atalanta, with Inter holding option to re-purchase his rights. He made several bench appearances for the squad in the first half of the 2018–19 Serie A season.

Loan to Pescara
On 14 January 2019, he joined Serie B club Pescara on loan until June 2020.

He made his Serie B debut for Pescara on 22 April 2019 in a game against Carpi, as a starter.

Monza
On 11 September 2020, Bettella joined Serie B side Monza on loan until 30 June 2022, with option and conditional obligation to purchase. He scored his first goals on 19 December, in the form of a brace, against his former club Pescara; despite his two goals, Monza lost 3–2 away from home. Following Monza's Serie A promotion on 29 May 2022, Bettella's obligation for purchase clause was triggered.

Loan to Palermo
On 19 August 2022, newly-promoted Serie B club Palermo announced the signing of Bettella on a loan deal with an option to buy.

International career
He was first called up to represent his country in 2015 for the Under-15 squad.

He represented the Under-17 team at the 2017 UEFA European Under-17 Championship (Italy did not advance from the group stage).

For the Under-19 squad, he scored the goal in the last qualification game that secured a spot for Italy at the 2018 UEFA European Under-19 Championship. Italy reached the final at the competition, where they lost to Portugal in a shootout.

After the tournament, Bettella continued to be age-eligible for the squad and became its captain, as it qualified for the 2019 edition of the tournament. However he took part in the 2019 FIFA U-20 World Cup with the Italy U20 squad, reaching the fourth place.

He made his debut with the Italy U21 on 14 October 2019, in a qualifying match won 1–0 against Armenia.

Career statistics

Club

Honours
Italy U19
 UEFA European Under-19 Championship runner-up: 2018

References

External links
 

2000 births
Sportspeople from Padua
Footballers from Veneto
Living people
Italian footballers
Association football central defenders
Inter Milan players
Atalanta B.C. players
Delfino Pescara 1936 players
A.C. Monza players
Palermo F.C. players
Serie B players
Italy youth international footballers